A number of steamships have been named Pagenturm, including:-

, a cargo ship in service 1909-14
, a Hansa A Type cargo ship in service 1944-45
, a Hansa A Type cargo ship in service 1956-64

Ship names